Adrián Bernabé Garcia (born 26 May 2001) is a Spanish professional footballer who plays as a midfielder for Parma.

Career

Manchester City
A youth product of RCD Espanyol and La Masia, the FC Barcelona academy, Bernabé joined Manchester City in the summer of 2018. An attacking midfielder, Bernabé joined the first team in pre-season playing against Bayern Munich and played in the EFL Trophy against Shrewsbury Town. On 25 September 2018, Bernabé came on as a late substitute in the EFL Cup against Oxford United, his first senior appearance for Manchester City. Bernabé was released by City at the end of the 2020–21 season.

Parma
On 7 July 2021, he joined Parma.

References

2001 births
Living people
Association football midfielders
Spanish footballers
Spain youth international footballers
Spain under-21 international footballers
Manchester City F.C. players
Parma Calcio 1913 players
Spanish expatriate footballers
Expatriate footballers in England
Expatriate footballers in Italy
Spanish expatriate sportspeople in England
Spanish expatriate sportspeople in Italy
Footballers from Barcelona